The Intel-based MacBook Pro is a discontinued line of Macintosh notebook computers sold by Apple Inc. from 2006 to 2021. It was the higher-end model of the MacBook family, sitting above the consumer-focused MacBook Air, and was sold with 13-inch to 17-inch screens.

The aluminum MacBook Pro used the design of the PowerBook G4, but replaced the PowerPC G4 chips with Intel Core processors, added a webcam, and introduced the MagSafe power connector. The 15-inch model was introduced in January 2006; the 17-inch model in April. Later revisions added Intel Core 2 Duo processors and LED-backlit displays.

The unibody model debuted in October 2008 in 13- and 15-inch variants, with a 17-inch variant added in January 2009. Called the "unibody" model because its case was machined from a single piece of aluminum, it had a thinner flush display, a redesigned trackpad whose entire surface consisted of a single clickable button, and a redesigned keyboard. Updates brought Intel Core i5 and i7 processors and introduced Intel's Thunderbolt.

The retina MacBook Pro was released in 2012: the 15-inch in June 2012, a 13-inch model in October. It is thinner than its predecessor, made solid-state storage (SSD) standard, added HDMI, and included a high-resolution Retina display. It eliminated Ethernet and FireWire ports and the optical drive.

The Touch Bar MacBook Pro, released in October 2016, adopted USB-C for all data ports and power and included a shallower "butterfly"-mechanism keyboard. On all but the base model, the function keys were replaced with a touchscreen strip called the Touch Bar with a Touch ID sensor integrated into the power button.

A November 2019 revision to the Touch Bar MacBook Pro introduced the Magic Keyboard, which uses a scissor-switch mechanism. The initial 16-inch model with a screen set in narrower bezels was followed by a 13-inch model in May 2020.

The Intel-based MacBook Pros was succeeded by Apple silicon MacBook Pros beginning in 2020 as part of the Mac transition to Apple silicon. On November 10, 2020, Apple discontinued the two-port 13-inch model following the release of a new model based on the Apple M1. The 16-inch and four-port 13-inch models were discontinued on October 18, 2021, following the release of 14-inch and 16-inch models based on the M1 Pro and M1 Max.

Aluminum (2006–2008) 

The original 15-inch MacBook Pro was announced on January 10, 2006, by Steve Jobs at the Macworld Conference & Expo. The 17-inch model was unveiled on April 24, 2006. The first design was largely a carryover from the PowerBook G4, but uses Intel Core CPUs instead of PowerPC G4 chips. The 15-inch MacBook Pro weighs the same as the 15-inch aluminum PowerBook G4, but is  deeper,  wider, and  thinner. Other changes from the PowerBook include a built-in iSight webcam and the inclusion of MagSafe, a magnetic power connector designed to detach easily when yanked. These features were later brought over to the MacBook. The optical drive was shrunk to fit into the slimmer MacBook Pro; it runs slower than the optical drive in the PowerBook G4 and cannot write to dual-layer DVDs.

Both the original 15- and 17-inch model MacBook Pro computers come with ExpressCard/34 slots, which replace the PC Card slots found in the PowerBook G4. Initial aluminum 15-inch models retains the two USB 2.0 ports and a FireWire 400 port but drops the FireWire 800, until it was readded in a later revision, the 17-inch models have an additional USB 2.0 port, as well as the FireWire 800 port missing from the initial 15-inch models. All models now included 802.11a/b/g. Later models include support for the draft 2.0 specification of 802.11n and Bluetooth 2.1.

Updates 
Apple refreshed the entire MacBook Pro line on October 24, 2006, to include Intel Core 2 Duo processors which were the first 64-Bit processors in the MacBook Pro. Memory capacity was doubled for each model, up to 2 GB for the high-end 15- and 17-inch models. FireWire 800 was added to the 15-inch models and hard drive capacity was also increased. The MacBook Pro line received a second update on June 5, 2007, with new Nvidia Geforce 8600M GT video cards and faster processor options. Furthermore, the speed of the front-side bus was increased from 667 to 800 MHz. The EFI also was 64-bit for the first time as well. On November 1, 2007, Apple added the option of a 2.6 GHz Santa Rosa platform Core 2 Duo CPU as well as reconfigured hard drive options. The keyboard also received several changes to closely mirror the one which shipped with the iMac, by adding the same keyboard shortcuts to control multimedia, and removing the embedded numeric keypad and the Apple logo from the command keys.

On February 26, 2008, the MacBook Pro line was updated once more. LED backlighting was added as an option for the 17-inch model. Processors were updated to "Penryn" cores, which are built on the 45 nm process (65 nm "Merom" cores were previously used), and hard drive and memory capacities were increased. Multi-touch capabilities, first introduced with the MacBook Air earlier that year, were brought over to the trackpad.

The original case design was discontinued on October 14, 2008, for the 15-inch, and January 6, 2009, for the 17-inch.

Reception 
Some reviewers applauded the MacBook Pro for its doubling or tripling the speed of the PowerBook G4 in some areas. For example, the 3D rendering program Cinema 4D XL was 3.3 times as fast (2.3 times faster), and its boot-up time was more than twice as quick. The MacBook Pro generally outperformed the PowerBook G4 in performance analyzer utility tests XBench and Cinebench. Reviewers lauded the screen's maximum brightness, 67% brighter than the PowerBook G4; the excellent horizontal viewing angles; the matte options; and the bright, crisp, and true colors. Reviewers praised the new MagSafe power adapter, although one reviewer said it disconnected too easily in some instances. They also praised the backlit keyboard, large trackpad, and virtually silent operation of the machine. The new notebook also offered better wireless performance.

One reviewer criticized the decision to underclock the ATI Mobility Radeon X1600 graphics card by about 30% its original speed. The notebook was also noted for running hot. Users complained that upgrading system memory was harder than in older Apple notebooks. Since the dimensions for the 15-inch MacBook Pro were tweaked slightly from the 15-inch PowerBook G4, older accessories such as notebook sleeves did not work with the new models. Some users noted a slight flickering when the screen was on lower brightness settings. Apple increased the battery capacity by 10 Wh, going from 50 in the PowerBook G4 to 60, but the more powerful Core Duo CPU required more power. Battery life therefore remained about the same as in previous models, at three-plus hours.

2007–2008 model GPU problems 
Models of the MacBook Pro built from 2007 to early 2008 (15") / late 2008 (17") using the Nvidia 8600M GT chip reportedly exhibited failures in which the GPU die would detach from the chip carrier, the chip would detach from the logic board. The issue has been mitigated by some users by keeping the notebook cooler by means of less intensive use or alternative fan settings. Apple initially ignored reports, before admitting to the fault and replacing logic boards free of charge for up to 4 years after the purchase date. NVIDIA also confirmed the issue, and previously manufactured replacement GPUs, which some users have replaced themselves.

Technical specifications 
All are obsolete.

Unibody (2008–2012) 

On October 14, 2008, in a press event at company headquarters, Apple officials announced a new 15-inch MacBook Pro featuring a "precision aluminum unibody enclosure" and tapered sides similar to those of the MacBook Air. Designers shifted the MacBook Pro's ports to the left side of the case, and moved the optical disc drive slot from the front to the right side, similar to the MacBook. The new MacBook Pro computers had two video cards that the user could switch between: the Nvidia GeForce 9600M GT with either 256 or 512 MB of dedicated memory and a GeForce 9400M with 256 MB of shared system memory. Although the FireWire 400 port was removed, the FireWire 800 port remained. The DVI port was replaced with a Mini DisplayPort receptacle. The original unibody MacBook Pro came with a user-removable battery; Apple claimed five hours of use, with one reviewer reporting results closer to four hours on a continuous video battery stress test. Apple said that the battery would hold 80% of its charge after 300 recharges.

Design 
The unibody-construction MacBook Pro largely follows the styling of the original aluminum iMac and the MacBook Air and is slightly thinner than its predecessor, albeit wider and deeper due to the widescreen display. The screen is high-gloss, covered by an edge-to-edge reflective glass finish, while an anti-glare matte option is available in the 15- and 17-inch models in which the glass panel is removed. The entire trackpad is usable and acts as a clickable button. The trackpad is also larger than that of the aluminum models, giving more room for scrolling and multi-touch gestures. When the line was updated in April 2010, inertial scrolling was added, making the scrolling experience much like that of the iPhone and iPad. The keys, which are still backlit, are now identical to those of Apple's now-standard sunken keyboard with separated black keys. The physical screen release latch from the aluminum models is replaced with a magnetic one.

Updates 

During the MacWorld Expo keynote on January 6, 2009, Phil Schiller announced a 17-inch MacBook Pro with unibody construction. This version diverged from its 15-inch sibling with an anti-glare "matte" screen option (with the glossy finish standard) and a non user-removable lithium polymer battery. Instead of traditional round cells inside the casing, the lithium-ion polymer batteries are shaped and fitted into each notebook to maximally utilize space. Adaptive charging, which uses a chip to optimize the charge flow to reduce wear and tear, extends the battery's overall life. Battery life for the 17-inch version is quoted at eight hours, with 80 percent of this charge remaining after 1,000 charge-discharge cycles.

At Apple's Worldwide Developers Conference (WWDC) on June 8, 2009, it was announced that the 13-inch unibody MacBook would be upgraded and re-branded as a MacBook Pro, leaving only the white polycarbonate MacBook in the MacBook line. It was also announced that the entire MacBook Pro line would use the non-user-removable battery first introduced in the 17-inch MacBook Pro. The updated MacBook Pro 13- and the 15-inch would each have up to a claimed 7 hours of battery life, while the 17-inch would keep its 8-hour capacity. Some sources even reported up to eight hours of battery life for the 13- and 15-inch MacBook Pro computers during casual use, while others reported around six hours. Like the 17-inch MacBook Pro, Apple claims that they will last around 1,000 charging cycles while still containing 80% of their capacity. Graphics card options stayed the same from the previous release, although the 13-inch and the base model 15-inch, came with only the GeForce 9400M GPU. The screens were also improved, gaining a claimed 60 percent greater color gamut. All of these mid-2009 models also included a FireWire 800 port and all except the 17-inch models would receive an SD card slot. The 17-inch model would retain its ExpressCard/34 slot. For the 13-inch MacBook Pro, the Kensington lock slot was moved to the right side of the chassis. In August 2009, Apple extended the "matte" anti-glare display option to the 15-inch MacBook Pro.

On April 13, 2010, Intel Core i5 and Core i7 CPUs were introduced in the 15- and 17-inch models, while the 13-inch retained the Core 2 Duo with a speed increase. The power brick was redesigned and a high-resolution display (of ) was announced as an option for the 15-inch models. The 13-inch gained an integrated Nvidia GeForce 320M graphics processing unit (GPU) with 256 MB of shared memory, while the 15- and 17-inch models were upgraded to the GeForce GT 330M, with either 256 or 512 MB of dedicated memory. The 15- and 17-inch models also have an integrated Intel GPU that is built into the Core i5 and i7 processors. The 15-inch model also gained . Save for a third USB 2.0 slot, all the ports on the 17-inch MacBook Pro are the same in type and number as on the 15-inch version. All models come with 4 GB of system memory that is upgradeable to 8 GB. Battery life was also extended further in this update, to an estimated 10 hours for the 13-inch and 8–9 hours on the 15- and 17-inch MacBook Pro computers. This was achieved through both greater power efficiency and adding more battery capacity. One reviewer reported about 6 hours of battery life through a continuous video battery stress test in the 15-inch and another, who called the battery life "unbeatable", reported nearer to 8 in the 13-inch through their "highly demanding battery drain test".

Thunderbolt technology, Sandy Bridge dual-core Intel Core i5 and i7 (on the 13-inch model) or quad-core i7 (on the 15- and 17-inch models) processors, and a high definition FaceTime camera were added on February 24, 2011. Intel HD Graphics 3000 come integrated with the CPU, while the 15- and 17-inch models also utilize AMD Radeon HD 6490M and Radeon HD 6750M graphics cards. Later editions of these models, following the release of OS X Lion, replaced the Expose (F3) key with a Mission Control key, and the Dashboard (F4) key with a Launchpad key. The chassis bottoms are also engraved differently from the 2010 models. The Thunderbolt serial bus platform can achieve speeds of up to 10 Gbit/s, which is up to twice as fast as the USB 3.0 specification, 20 times faster than the USB 2.0 specification, and up to 12 times faster than FireWire 800. Apple says that Thunderbolt can be used to drive displays or to transfer large quantities of data in a short amount of time.

On June 11, 2012, Apple showcased its upgraded Mac notebooks, OS X Mountain Lion, and iOS 6 at the Worldwide Developers Conference (WWDC) in San Francisco. The new MacBook Pro models were updated with Ivy Bridge processors and USB 3.0 ports, and the default RAM on premium models was increased to 8 GB. Following this announcement, the 17-inch model was discontinued. After a media event on October 22, 2013, Apple discontinued all unibody MacBook Pro computers except for the entry-level 2.5 GHz 13-inch model. Apple discontinued the 13-inch unibody MacBook Pro on October 27, 2016. Prior to its discontinuation it was Apple's only product to still include an optical drive and a FireWire port, and only notebook with a hard disk drive and Ethernet port. It is also the only MacBook Pro to support 11 versions of macOS, from Mac OS X Leopard 10.5 through macOS Catalina 10.15.

Reception 
Some reviewers praised the new notebook's performance and compact size, the quality of the screen, and sturdy unibody build, which allowed easier upgrading of internal components as compared to the original models. Some reviewers also noted that the new MacBook Pro ran more quietly and at cooler temperatures than aluminum machines. Others, however, criticized the amount of heat generated by the new design.

The Reviewers lamented the loss of a matte screen option for the 2008 unibody MacBook Pro, noting the reflectiveness of the screen in sunlight, even when its brightness was turned all the way up. CNET's Dan Ackerman commented of the mid-2009 models: "According to Apple, the new display offers a wider color gamut, and the screen certainly looks bright and colorful, but we wish the same matte-screen option offered on the 17-inch MacBook Pro was available across the line... While the LED screen means a thinner lid and some battery life benefits, the edge-to-edge glass covering the entire display panel grabs stray light rays with ease, making the glossy screen hard to see in some lighting conditions." By 2011, matte screens were offered for both the 15" and 17" models. Furthermore, the addition of Mini DisplayPort instead of the more popular HDMI was criticized. The relatively low number of ports and lower end technical specifications when compared to similarly priced laptops from other brands were also bemoaned.

Laptop Magazines Michael Prospero praised the 2010 15-inch model's display, calling it "bright and crisp". He further commented, "While reflections from the glossy display weren't overwhelming, it's also nice to know there's an antiglare option—though only for the higher resolution display. Still, colors were bright, blacks were deep and dark, and viewing angles were excellent both vertically and horizontally." He also lauded the quality of the iSight webcam, the responsiveness of the trackpad, the microphone and speakers, as well as the performance of the new CPUs for the 15" model and the long battery life. Complaints included the price of the notebook, the low number of USB ports, and the lack of HDMI.

CNET praised the automatic graphics switching features of the 15- and 17-inch 2010 models as well as the graphics cards themselves. Acclaim was also given to the Core i5 and i7 CPUs, the multi-touch trackpad, and the addition of audio capabilities to the Mini DisplayPort video output. They also called for the addition of HDMI and the Blu-ray optical disc format, saying that most other computers in the MacBook Pro's price range possessed these features. CNET also criticized the option of a higher-resolution screen in the 15-inch model, saying that "the higher-resolution screen should be included by default."

Technical specifications 
Most of Unibody models are "obsolete" only the Mid 2012 13" models which are going to be obsolete in the next months are "vintage".

Since the RAM and the hard drive on some generations of MacBook Pro are user-serviceable parts, there are aftermarket modifications to enhance the system with up to 16 GB DDR3-1600 RAM (although maximum capacity and frequency depend on the hardware in question), 7,200 rpm hard drives or third-party SSDs. A third-party caddy was also made, allowing the internal optical drive to be replaced with a second internal SATA 2.5-inch hard drive.

Early and late 2011 model GPU problems 
Early and late 2011 models with a GPU; 15" & 17"; reportedly suffer from manufacturing problems leading to overheating, graphical problems, and eventually complete GPU and logic board failure. A similar but nonidentical problem affected iMac GPUs which were later recalled by Apple. The problem was covered by many articles in Mac-focused magazines, starting late 2013 throughout 2014. In August 2014 the law firm Whitfield Bryson & Mason LLP had begun investigating the problem to determine if any legal claim exists. On October 28, 2014, the firm announced that it has filed a class-action lawsuit in a California federal court against Apple. The lawsuit will cover residents residing in both California and Florida who have purchased a 2011 MacBook Pro notebook with an AMD graphics card. The firm is also investigating similar cases across the United States. On February 20, 2015, Apple instituted the  This "will repair affected MacBook Pro systems, free of charge". The program covered affected MacBook Pro models until December 31, 2016, four years from original date of sale.

Retina (2012–2015) 

On June 11, 2012, at the Apple Worldwide Developers Conference in San Francisco, Apple introduced the Retina MacBook Pro, the 15-inch in June 2012, a 13-inch model in October, marketed as the "MacBook Pro with Retina display" to differentiate it from the previous model. The new model includes Intel's third-generation Core i7 processors (Ivy Bridge microarchitecture). It made solid-state storage (SSD) standard, upgraded to USB 3.0, added an additional Thunderbolt port, added HDMI, and included a high-resolution  Retina display. The 15-inch model is 25% thinner than its predecessor. The model name is no longer placed at the bottom of the screen bezel; instead, it is found on the underside of the chassis, similar to an iOS device and is the first Macintosh notebook to not have its model name visible during normal use. It eliminated Ethernet, FireWire 800 ports, but Thunderbolt adapters were available for purchase, Kensington lock slot, the battery indicator button and light on the side of the chassis, and the optical drive, being the first professional notebook since the PowerBook 2400c, but brought a new MagSafe port, dubbed the "MagSafe 2". Apple also claims improved speakers and microphones and a new system for cooling the notebook with improved fans.

The MacBook Pro with Retina display was one of only two Macs that feature a built-in HDMI port (the other being the Mac Mini). Apple introduced a 13-inch version on October 23, 2012, with specifications similar but slightly inferior to the 15-inch version's, such as less powerful processors.

The Retina models also have fewer user-accessible upgrade or replacement options than previous MacBooks. Unlike in previous generations, the memory is soldered onto the logic board and is therefore not upgradable. The solid state drive is not soldered and can be replaced by users, although it has a proprietary connector and form factor. The battery is glued into place; attempts to remove it may destroy the battery and/or trackpad. The entire case uses proprietary pentalobe screws and cannot be disassembled with standard tools. While the battery is glued in, recycling companies have stated that the design is only "mildly inconvenient" and does not hamper the recycling process. In any case, Apple offers a free recycling service via any of their stores and has no problem with separating the materials.

On February 13, 2013, Apple announced updated prices and processors and increased the memory of the high-end 15-inch model to 16 GB.

On October 22, 2013, Apple updated the line with Intel's Haswell processors and Iris Graphics, 802.11ac Wi-Fi, Thunderbolt 2, and PCIe-based flash storage. The lower-end 15-inch model only included integrated graphics while the higher-end model continued to include a discrete Nvidia graphics card in addition to integrated graphics. Support for 4K video output via HDMI was added but limited the maximum number of external displays from three to two. On July 29, 2014, Apple announced new models with updated prices and processors.

On March 9, 2015, the 13-inch model was updated with Intel Broadwell processors, Iris 6100 graphics, faster flash storage (based on PCIe 2.0 × 4 technology), faster RAM (upgraded from 1600MHZ to 1866MHZ), increased battery life (extended to 10 hours), and a Force Touch trackpad. On May 19, 2015, 15-inch model added Force Touch and changed the GPU to AMD Radeon R9 M370X, SSD based on PCIe 3.0 × 4 technology, the battery life was extended to 9 hours, and the rest of the configuration remained unchanged. The higher-end 15-inch model also added support for dual-cable output to  displays. The 15-inch models were released with the same Intel Haswell processors and Iris Pro graphics as the 2014 models due to a delay in shipment of newer Broadwell quad-core processors. Apple continued to sell the 2015 15-inch model until July 2018.

Reception 
The Retina MacBook Pro received positive reviews of the Retina Display, flash storage and power. It was criticized, however, for its high price and lack of an Ethernet port and optical drive. Roman Loyola of Macworld said that the Retina MacBook Pro was "groundbreaking" and made people "rethink how they use technology". He praised the inclusion of USB 3.0 and the slimmer body. Dan Ackerman of CNET commented "I've previously called the 15-inch MacBook Pro one of the most universally useful all-around laptops you can buy. This new version adds to that with HDMI, faster ports, and more portability. But it also subtracts from that with its exclusion of an optical drive and Ethernet port, plus its very high starting price. The Pro and Retina Pro are clearly two laptops designed for two different users, and with the exception of all-day commuters who need something closer to a MacBook Air or ultrabook, one of the two branches of the MacBook Pro family tree is still probably the most universally useful laptop you can buy."

Joel Santo Domingo of PC Magazine gave the MacBook Pro an "Editor's Choice" rating. He praised its "brilliant Retina display", the thin design, port selection and speedy storage, and highlighted the expandability via Thunderbolt ports which support up to seven devices each. David Pogue of The New York Times praised the 15-inch model's screen, keyboard, sound, start-up time, cosmetics, battery life, storage, and RAM capacity. They criticized the lack of a SuperDrive, pricing, and the MagSafe 2 power connector's lack of backwards compatibility with the older MagSafe design.

The Retina Display on the MacBook Pro have been criticized for "image retention", specifically for displays manufactured by LG. Many users also complained the Anti-reflective coating on their screens could wear off easily, which is an issue known as "staingate".

In 2017, one year after the introduction of the Touch Bar of the MacBook Pro, the original lead developer of Tumblr Marco Arment wrote an evocative article in which he declared the Retina MacBook Pro the best laptop ever made. The sentiment was shared by many users of various social platforms.

Repairability and environmental concerns 
Apple was criticized for gluing the battery into the case, making it harder to be recycled (ease of disassembly is an EPEAT criterion), but some recycling companies have stated that the design is only "mildly inconvenient" and does not hamper the recycling process. Greenpeace spokesman Casey Harrell said Apple "has pitted design against the environment—and chosen design. They're making a big bet that people don't care, but recycling is a big issue." Wired also criticized Apple's recyclability claims in 2012: "[t]he design may well be  'highly recyclable aluminum and glass'—but my friends in the electronics recycling industry tell me they have no way of recycling aluminum that has glass glued to it like Apple did with both this machine and the recent iPad."

Battery problems 
In June 2019, Apple announced a worldwide recall for certain 2015 15" MacBook Pro computers after receiving at least 26 reports of batteries becoming hot enough to produce smoke and inflict minor burns or property damage. The problem affected some 432,000 computers, mostly sold between September 2015 and February 2017. The company asked customers to stop using their computers until Apple could replace the batteries.

In September 2019, India's Directorate General of Civil Aviation said MacBook Pro computers could dangerously overheat, leading the national carrier Air India to ban the model on its flights.

Technical specifications

Touch Bar (2016–2020) 

Apple unveiled Touch Bar 13- and 15-inch MacBook Pro models during a press event at their headquarters on October 26, 2016. All models, except for the baseline 13-inch model, featured the Touch Bar, a new multi-touch-enabled OLED strip built into the top of the keyboard in place of the function keys. The Touch Bar is abutted on its right by a sapphire-glass button that doubles as a Touch ID sensor and a power button. The models also introduced a "second-generation" butterfly-mechanism keyboard whose keys have more travel than the first iteration in the Retina MacBook. The 13-inch model has a trackpad that is 46% larger than its predecessor while the 15-inch model has a trackpad twice as large as the previous generation.

All ports have been replaced with either two or four combination Thunderbolt 3 ports that support USB-C 3.1 Gen 2 and dual DisplayPort 1.2 signals, any of which can be used for charging. The MacBook Pro is incompatible with some older Thunderbolt 3-certified peripherals, including Intel's own reference design for Thunderbolt 3 devices. Furthermore, macOS on MacBook Pro blacklists (prevents from working) certain classes of Thunderbolt 3-compatible devices. Support for Thunderbolt 3 external graphics processing units (eGPU) was added in macOS High Sierra 10.13.4. Devices using HDMI, previous-generation Thunderbolt, and USB need an adapter to connect to the MacBook Pro. The models come with a 3.5 mm headphone jack; the TOSLINK functionality of older-generation MacBook Pro computers has been removed.

Other updates to the MacBook Pro include dual- and quad-core Intel "Skylake" Core i5 and i7 processors, improved graphics, and displays that offer a 25% wider color gamut, 67% more brightness, and 67% more contrast. All versions can output to a 5K display; the 15-inch models can drive two such displays. The 15-inch models include a discrete Radeon Pro 450, 455 or 460 graphics card in addition to the integrated Intel graphics. The base 13-inch model has function keys instead of the Touch Bar, and just two USB-C ports. The flash storage in the Touch Bar models is soldered to the logic board and is not upgradeable, while in the 13-inch model without Touch Bar, it is removable, but difficult to replace, as it is a proprietary format of SSD storage.

On June 5, 2017, Apple updated the line with Intel Kaby Lake processors and newer graphics cards. A 128 GB storage option was added for the base 13-inch model, down from the base 256 GB storage. New symbols were introduced to the control and option keys. On July 12, 2018, Apple updated the Touch Bar models with Intel Coffee Lake quad-core processors in 13-inch models and six-core processors in 15-inch models, updated graphics cards, third-generation butterfly keyboards that introduced new symbols for the control and option keys, Bluetooth 5, T2 SoC Chip, True Tone display technology, and larger-capacity batteries. The 15-inch model can also be configured with up to 4 TB of storage, 32 GB of DDR4 memory and a Core i9 processor. In late November the higher-end 15-inch model could be configured with Radeon Pro Vega graphics. On May 21, 2019, Apple announced updated Touch Bar models with newer processors, with an eight-core Core i9 standard for the higher-end 15-inch model, and an updated keyboard manufactured with "new materials" across the line. On July 9, 2019, Apple updated the 13-inch model with two Thunderbolt ports with newer quad-core eighth-generation processors and Intel Iris Plus graphics, True Tone display technology, and replaced the function keys with the Touch Bar. macOS Catalina added support for Dolby Atmos, Dolby Vision, and HDR10 on 2018 and newer models. macOS Catalina 10.15.2 added support for 6016x3384 output on 15-inch 2018 and newer models to run the Pro Display XDR at full resolution.

The 2019 MacBook Pro was the final model that could run macOS Mojave 10.14, the final MacOS version that can run 32-bit applications such as Adobe Creative Suite 6 or Microsoft Office for Mac 2011.

Design and usability 

The Touch Bar MacBook Pro follows the design of the Retina models, with an all-metal unibody enclosure and separated black keys. A few of the apparent design changes include a thinner chassis and screen bezel, a larger trackpad, the OLED Touch Bar, and the shallower butterfly-mechanism keyboard with less key separation than the previous models. The speaker grilles have been relocated to the sides of the keyboard on the 13-inch variant. Tear downs show that the speaker grilles on the 13-inch model with Touch Bar are "largely cosmetic", and that sound output mostly comes through the side vents. The Touch Bar MacBook Pro comes in two finishes, the traditional silver color and a darker "space gray" color. The MacBook Pro model name returns to the bottom of the screen bezel in Apple's San Francisco font after being absent from the Retina MacBook Pro. As with the Retina MacBook, the new models replace the backlit white Apple logo on the rear of the screen, a feature dating back to the 1999 PowerBook G3, with a glossy metal version.

MagSafe, a magnetic charging connector, has been replaced with USB-C charging. Unlike MagSafe, which provided an indicator light within the user's field of view to indicate the device's charging status, the USB-C charger has no visual indicator. Instead, the MacBook Pro emits a chime when connected to power. The Macintosh startup chime that has been used since the first Macintosh in 1984 is now disabled by default. The notebook now boots automatically when the lid is opened.

Battery life 
The battery life of the new models also got a mixed reception, with outlets reporting inconsistent battery life and inaccurate estimates of time remaining on battery by the operating system. After the latter reports, Apple used a macOS update to hide the display of estimated battery time. Consumer Reports did not initially recommend the 2016 MacBook Pro models, citing inconsistent and unpredictable battery life in its lab testing (which involves the consecutive loading of multiple websites). However, Apple and Consumer Reports found that the results had been affected by a bug caused by disabling caching in Safari's developer tools. Consumer Reports performed the tests again with a patched macOS, and retracted its original assessment.

Repairability 
iFixit scored the models 1 out of 10 for repairability, noting that memory, the processor, and flash storage are soldered to the logic board, while the battery is glued to the case. The entire assembly uses proprietary pentalobe screws and cannot be disassembled with standard tools.

Keyboard reliability 
A report by AppleInsider has claimed that the updated "Butterfly" keyboard fails twice as often as previous models, often due to particles stuck beneath the keys. Repairs for stuck keys have been estimated to cost more than $700. In May 2018,
two class action lawsuits were filed against Apple regarding the keyboard problem; one alleged a "constant threat of nonresponsive keys and accompanying keyboard failure" and accusing Apple of not alerting consumers to the problem. In June 2018, Apple announced a Service Program to "service eligible MacBook and MacBook Pro keyboards, free of charge". The 2018 models added a membrane underneath keys to prevent malfunction from dust. As of early 2019, there were reports of problems with the same type of keyboards in the 2018 MacBook Air. In May 2019, Apple modified the keyboard for the fourth time and promised that any MacBook keyboard with butterfly switches would be repaired or replaced free of charge for a period of four years after the date of sale.

Thermal throttling 
PC Magazine said "the Core i9 processor Apple chose to use inside the MacBook Pro (i9-8950K) has a base clock frequency of 2.9GHz, which is capable of bursting up to 4.8GHz when necessary. However, testing carried out by YouTuber Dave Lee showed that the Core i9 couldn't even maintain 2.9GHz, let alone 4.8GHz. And it ended up running at 2.2GHz due to the heat generated inside the chassis forcing it to throttle. Lee found the 2018 i9 MacBook Pro was slower than the 2017 MacBook Pro and stated, "This isn't a problem with Intel's Core i9, it's Apple's thermal solution." When Lee put the i9 MacBook Pro inside a freezer, the render times were over 30% faster.

On July 24, 2018, Apple released a software fix for the new 2018 MacBook Pro computers which addressed the thermal throttling problem. Apple said "there is a missing digital key in the firmware that impacts the thermal management system and could drive clock speeds down under heavy thermal loads on the new MacBook Pro".

Other problems 
A "limited number" of 13-inch MacBook Pro units without Touch Bar, manufactured between October 2016 and October 2017, saw the built-in battery swell. Apple created a free replacement program for eligible units.

A "limited number" of 128 and 256 GB solid-state drives used in 13-inch MacBook Pro (non-Touch Bar) units can lose data and fail. 13-inch MacBook Pro units with affected drives were sold between June 2017 and June 2018. This resulted in Apple launching a repair program for those affected – the repair involves the update of firmware.

Some users are reporting kernel panics on 2018 models, because of the T2 chip. Apple is already aware of the problem and performing an investigation. There are also user reports about the speaker crackling problems on the 2018 models.

Users have reported malfunctioning display cables, causing uneven lighting at the bottom of the screen and ultimately display failure. Customers of Apple have named this issue "Flexgate". The problem has been tracked to a cable, stressed from opening and closing the notebook. The entire display needs to be replaced in affected units. In May 2019 Apple initiated a program to replace the display on affected 13-inch models made in 2016 for free, and the cable on the 2018 models and onwards was made 2 mm longer than on prior models, thus reducing the likelihood of display failure. Apple has been criticized for not extending the replacement program to the 15-inch models which are also affected by this issue.

Reception 

The Touch Bar MacBook Pro received mixed reviews. The display, build quality, and audio quality were praised but many complained about the butterfly keyboard; the little-used Touch Bar; and the absence of USB-A ports, HDMI port, and SD card slot.

Ars Technica noted that the second-generation keyboard with firm keys was a "drastic departure" from previous Retina MacBook keyboards. It further noted that resting palms may brush the trackpad occasionally, causing inadvertent cursor jumps onscreen as the notebook interprets this as input, without one's hands or wrists actually resting on it. Bandwidth increased; the flash storage was about 40 percent faster. Engadget praised the thinner, lighter design; improved display and audio; and increased speed of the graphics and flash storage, but criticized the lack of ports and the price. Wired praised the display, calling it "the best laptop display I've ever seen", as well as praising the Touch Bar, though it criticized the need of adapters for many common connectors. Likewise, The Verge concluded that "using [the new MacBook] is alienating to anyone living in the present. I agree with Apple's vision of the future. I'm just not buying it today."

Engadget voiced their concerns that "by doing things like removing full-sized USB ports, the memory card reader and even the Function row, Apple seems to have forgotten how many of us actually work". Heavy keyboard users criticized the Touch Bar, noting that command-line tools like Vim rely on keyboard usage, and the Touch Bar does not provide the tactile feedback necessary for "blind" usage of Function keys. Miriam Nielsen from The Verge said: "When I tried to intentionally use the Touch Bar, I felt like a kid learning how to type again. I had to keep looking down at the bar instead of looking at the images I was actually trying to edit." She also said that after learning the Touch Bar one cannot work as efficiently on any other computer. Developers have their share of headaches because they cannot rely on the Touch Bar being present on every machine that runs their software. Even if Apple makes the Touch Bar an integral part of macOS, it will take "many years" for it to become ubiquitous, in the meantime, anything in the Bar needs to be available through another part of the interface.

Also criticized were non-compatibility between Thunderbolt 2 and 3 devices. Some found unpleasant the fan whine on the 15" model, where the two integrated fans run all the time by default, thanks to the coprocessor powering the Touch Bar and higher TDP of the stronger CPU models.

In 2016 and 2017, the Touch Bar caused concern among American state bars that the predictive text could be used to cheat on bar exams. The responses varied state by state: New York State Bar Association banned the use of the MacBook Pro on bar exams; while North Carolina Bar Association allowed students to take the state bar exam with the computer once a proctor verified that the predictive text feature had been disabled.

Technical specifications

Magic Keyboard revision 

Apple unveiled the fifth revision of the Touch Bar 13-inch MacBook Pro in 2020 and the 16-inch MacBook Pro on November 13, 2019, replacing the 15-inch model. Similar in size to the 15-inch model, it has a larger 16-inch 3072x1920 Retina display set in a narrower bezel, the largest MacBook screen since the 17-inch unibody MacBook Pro that was discontinued in 2012. It has a physical Escape key, a Touch Bar, and a now-separate sapphire-glass-covered Touch ID sensor at the right end of the Touch Bar that doubles as a power button. It uses a scissor mechanism keyboard almost identical to Apple's wireless Magic Keyboard, providing more travel than the previous revision's "Butterfly" keyboard.

Like its predecessor, the 16-inch MacBook Pro has four combined Thunderbolt 3 ports that support USB-C 3.1 Gen 2 and dual DisplayPort 1.4 signals, providing 6016×3384 output to run the Pro Display XDR at full resolution. Any port can be used for charging, it includes a 96 W USB-C power adapter. At launch only the included adapter and the Pro Display XDR provide full host power. Peripherals that delivered 87 W for the 15-inch model, such as LG Ultrafine displays, are recommended to be used with a separate power supply. It also has a 3.5 mm headphone jack.

It uses the same Coffee Lake CPUs as the 2019 15-inch model. Purchasers can choose between AMD Radeon Pro 5300M or 5500M GPUs with up to 8 GB of GDDR6 memory (or from June 2020 onwards, a 5600M GPU with 8 GB of HBM2 memory), up to 64 GB of 2667 MHz DDR4 memory, and up to 8 TB of SSD storage. It includes better speakers, a better three-microphone array, and a 100 Wh battery, the largest that can be easily carried onto a commercial airliner under U.S. Transportation Security Administration rules.

On May 4, 2020, Apple announced an updated 13-inch model with the Magic Keyboard. The four Thunderbolt port version comes with Ice Lake processors, updated graphics, up to 32 GB of memory and 4 TB of storage, and supports 6K output to run the Pro Display XDR. The two Thunderbolt port version has the same Coffee Lake processors, graphics, and maximum storage and memory as the 2019 two Thunderbolt port models. The 2020 13-inch models also gain 0.02 inches (0.6 mm) in thickness over the 2019 models.

Reception 
Reception to the 16-inch MacBook Pro was generally positive. LaptopMag called the keyboard "much-improved". The Verge praised the new keyboard, microphones, and speakers, but criticized the lack of peripherals such as an SD card slot. 9to5Mac criticized the use of a 720p webcam and older 802.11ac Wi-Fi standard, noting that Apple's iPhone 11 family included a 4K front-facing camera and faster Wi-Fi 6. MacWorld also noted the lack of Face ID. Another review noted that the 2020 two Thunderbolt port 13-inch model is unable to run Apple's Pro Display XDR at full resolution, while the lower-priced 2020 MacBook Air can.

There are numerous reports of cracked screens caused by closing the unit with a third-party physical webcam cover due to reduced clearance compared to previous models.

Technical specifications

Software and operating systems 
The macOS operating system has been pre-installed on all MacBook Pro computers since release, starting with version 10.4.4 (Tiger). Along with OS X, iLife has also shipped with all systems, beginning with iLife '06.

The Intel-based MacBook Pro comes with the successor to BIOS, Extensible Firmware Interface (EFI) 1.1. EFI handles booting differently from BIOS-based computers, but provides backwards compatibility, allowing dual- and triple-boot configurations. In addition to OS X, the Microsoft Windows operating system is installable on Intel x86-based Apple computers. Officially, this is limited to 32-bit versions of Windows XP, Vista, and 7, and 64-bit versions of Windows Vista, 7, 8, 8.1, and 10 with the necessary hardware drivers included with the Boot Camp software. Other x86 operating systems such as Linux are also unofficially supported. This is made possible by the presence of the Intel architecture as provided by the CPU and the BIOS emulation Apple has provided on top of EFI.

macOS Big Sur, the seventeenth major release of macOS, will work with Wi-Fi and graphics acceleration on unsupported MacBook Pro computers with a compatible patch utility.

Timeline

See also 
 MacBook (12-inch)
 MacBook Air

Notes

References

External links 
  – official site

Computer-related introductions in 2006
Pro
X86 Macintosh computers
Products and services discontinued in 2021
Discontinued Apple Inc. products